The 1975 Barnett Bank Tennis Classic was a women's tennis tournament played on outdoor green clay courts at the Orlando Racquet Club in Orlando, Florida in the United States. It was part of the Women's International Grand Prix of the 1975 WTA Tour. It was the second and last edition of the tournament and was held from October 13 through October 19, 1975. First-seeded Chris Evert won the singles title and earned $10,000 first-prize money after Martina Navratilova had to forfeit her singles and doubles finals due to bursitis in her left shoulder.

Finals

Singles
 Chris Evert defeated  Martina Navratilova walkover
 It was Evert's 15th singles title of the year and the 54th of her career.

Doubles
 Rosemary Casals /  Wendy Overton defeated  Chris Evert /  Martina Navratilova walkover

Prize money

References

Barnett Bank Tennis Classic
1975 in sports in Florida
1975 in American tennis